Sjoerdtje Willemien (Sjoera) Dikkers (born 14 July 1969 in Deventer) is a Dutch former politician and activist. As a member of the Labour Party (Partij van de Arbeid) she was an MP between 17 June 2010 and 23 March 2017. She focused on matters of development aid and commercial policy.

On 25 October 2016 Dikkers went on health leave and was temporarily replaced by Rien van der Velde, and from 14 December 2016 until 14 February 2017 by Emre Ünver.

References

External links 
  House of Representatives biography

1969 births
Living people
Dutch activists
Dutch women activists
Labour Party (Netherlands) politicians
Members of the House of Representatives (Netherlands)
People from Deventer
21st-century Dutch politicians
21st-century Dutch women politicians